The Democratic Movement (MoDem) is a centre to centre-right political party in France that is characterised by a strong pro-European stance. MoDem was founded by François Bayrou to succeed the Union for French Democracy (UDF) and contest the 2007 legislative election, after his strong showing in the 2007 presidential election. Initially named the Democratic Party (Parti démocrate), the party was renamed "Democratic Movement", because there was already a small Democratic Party in France.

MoDem secured an agreement with La République En Marche! in the 2017 legislative election after Bayrou endorsed the candidacy of Emmanuel Macron in February. In June 2017, the MoDem and its MEPs were accused of potentially fictitious employment practices within the European Parliament. Bayrou resigned on 21 June from his post as Justice Minister soon after he became embroiled in the fictitious employment scandals, and allegations of harassment against a journalist reporting on the scandal.

History

Background

The MoDem traces its roots to the Union for French Democracy (UDF), centrist coalition/party active from 1978 to 2007.

Traditionally, the UDF had always supported centre-right governments since its creation by Valéry Giscard d'Estaing. The UDF aligned itself with the Union for a Popular Movement (UMP) following its creation in 2002, and even took part in the government coalition in the Senate from 2002 to 2007, though it did not participate in the Cabinet (except for Gilles de Robien). However, during the second term of Jacques Chirac, the UDF became increasingly independent from the UMP. On the initiative of its leader, François Bayrou, it eventually supported a censure motion along with the Socialist Party (PS).

2007 presidential election
During the 2007 presidential campaign, Bayrou advocated a national unity government. He presented himself as a centrist and a social-liberal, proclaiming that, if elected, he would "govern beyond the left-right divide". Although eliminated in the first round, over 18% of voters supported him, partly because of his independence from major parties. Following the election, he founded the Democratic Movement (MoDem) on 29 May to reinforce his strategy of political independence. MoDem was also supported by the Union of Radical Republicans.

Some members of the UDF did not agree with this new strategy because the weighted French balloting system would hinder the Democratic Movement from obtaining seats in the legislative elections. These members created the New Centre, continuing their support for the newly elected president Nicolas Sarkozy.

2007 legislative election
The MoDem won 7.6% of the votes in the first round of the June 2007 legislative election.

Candidates ran under the UDF-MoDem banner, since the party had not yet been created officially. The party gained three seats in the National Assembly (not including Abdoulatifou Aly who was elected in Mayotte for a party affiliated to the MoDem. He sat with the New Centre for a short while but he is now sitting with the MoDem deputies). Thierry Benoit, one of the four MPs, has been vocally critical of the party, but he actually sits for the MoDem and defends the movement's policies. He stated that he had been elected jointly by centre-right and left-wing citizens.

Official foundation
The MoDem became an official political party on 1 December 2007 following its founding assembly in Villepinte, Seine-Saint-Denis, in the suburbs of Paris. The assembly elected Bayrou, who ran uncontested, as the party president, and also elected 29 others to the provisional executive board. On 30 November 2007, the UDF effectively ceased to exist, and was fully integrated within MoDem.

2012 presidential and legislative elections
At the 2012 presidential election Bayrou won 9.3% of the vote, a half of what he had obtained five years before. In the subsequent legislative election the party was reduced to 1.8% and won only two seats while Bayrou lost his seat in the National Assembly, which he had held for most of his political career.

2014 municipal elections
In the city counting more than  inhabitants, the party scored an average of 15%, winning over 50 cities. Bayrou won in Pau, while the party continues to run cities like Biarritz, Saint-Brieuc, Mont-de-Marsan and Talence, and is part of the ruling coalition in Bordeaux, Dijon, Saint-Étienne and Auxerre, among others.

2014 European Parliament election
In an alliance with the Union of Democrats and Independents (UDI), also a successor of the Union for French Democracy, MoDem obtained 9.93% of the national level vote in France.

Ensemble Citoyens 
Ahead of the 2022 legislative elections, MoDem formed a coalition with two other centrist parties – Horizons and La République En Marche! – to coordinate which candidates it presents.

Ideology
During the 2007 presidential election, Bayrou stressed three points: the public debt, the need for change and ouverture to the right/left political system, and the need of constitutional reforms in that direction.

International affiliations
In 2004, Bayrou launched the European Democratic Party (EDP) along with Francesco Rutelli's Democracy is Freedom – The Daisy. In 2005, the EDP created, along with the New Democrat Coalition of the United States Democratic Party, the Alliance of Democrats, a worldwide network of centrist and social liberal parties.

In the European Parliament, MoDem sits in the Renew Europe group with 5 MEPs.

In the European Committee of the Regions, MoDem sits in the Renew Europe CoR group with one full member for the 2020-2025 mandate. Vincent Chauvet is Coordinator in the ENVE Commission.

Electoral results

Presidential elections 
This table includes the 2002 and 2007 elections in which the MoDem founder, François Bayrou, presented himself as a candidate of the Union for French Democracy (UDF).

Legislative elections

European Parliament elections
The 2014 elections involved an alliance with the forces of the Union of Democrats and Independents (UDI); this joint list, The Alternative (L'Alternative), saw four MoDem MEPs out of seven elected from the list.

See also
Democratic Movement and affiliated group
Centrist Union group

References

External links

2007 establishments in France
Political parties established in 2007
Political parties of the French Fifth Republic
European Democratic Party
Centrist parties in France
Centre-right parties in Europe
Christian democratic parties in Europe
Social liberal parties
Pro-European political parties in France
Democratic Movement (France)